 

The retriangulation of Great Britain was a triangulation project carried out between 1935 and 1962 that sought to improve the accuracy of maps made of Great Britain. Data gathered from the retriangulation replaced data gathered during the Principal Triangulation of Great Britain, which had been performed between 1783 and 1851.

History 
The retriangulation was begun in 1935 by the Director General of the Ordnance Survey, Major-General Malcolm MacLeod. It was directed by the cartographer and mathematician Martin Hotine, head of the Trigonometrical and Levelling Division.

A problem during the Principal Triangulation was that the exact locations of surveying stations were not always rediscoverable, relying on buried markers and unreliable local knowledge. To overcome this, a network of permanent surveying stations was built, most familiarly the concrete triangulation pillars (about 6,500 of them) found on many British Isles hill and mountain tops, but there were many other kinds of surveying stations used.

To minimise differences between the 1783-1851 survey and the retriangulation, eleven Principal Triangulation stations from Dunnose on the Isle of Wight to Great Whernside in Yorkshire were chosen and pillars erected on them to act as the core framework from which all other measurements were made.

The main work of the Retriangulation was finished in 1962, creating the now familiar Ordnance Survey National Grid, with the system continuing to be used and measurements refined by ground-based surveying into the 1980s, after which satellite use took over. Electronic measuring devices were introduced towards the end of the Retriangulation, but at that time were not proven reliable enough to replace traditional surveying.

Notes and references

Bibliography

See also
Geodesy
OSGB36
Reference frame
Triangulation
Trig point

External links
Daily Telegraph article about the retriangulation of Great Britain
National GPS Network
Information and Maps on many aspects of Trigangulation (& Levelling) in Great Britain

Angle
Surveying of the United Kingdom
Geography of Great Britain
Geodetic surveys